The 31st (Oldenburg) Airborne Brigade was a 3,600 man strong formation in the German Army with its headquarters in Oldenburg in north Germany. It was subordinated to the Special Operations Division and classified as part of the Army’s stabilisation forces. All elements of the Brigade were stationed in the state of Lower Saxony, the majority in Seedorf.

In 2014 the brigade was restructured as 31st Paratrooper Regiment which joined the 1st Airborne Brigade on 1 April 2015.

Commanders 
The following commanders have led the Brigade (rank given on appointment):

Subordinate units
 31st Airborne Brigade HQ Company 
 270 Airborne Engineer Company  (Luftlandepionierkompanie 270)
 272 Airborne Support Battalion (LuftlandeunterstützungsBtl 272)
 310 Airborne Recce Company (LuftlandeaufklärungsKp 310)
 313 Parachute Battalion (Fallschirmjägerbataillon 313)
 373 Parachute Battalion (Fallschirmjägerbataillon 373)

See also 
1st Airborne Division
Special Operations Division

Literature 
Sören Sünkler: Die Spezialverbände der Bundeswehr. Stuttgart: Motorbuch Verlag 2007.

References

External links 
 Website of the Brigade
 273 Parachute Battalion
Federal archives
 314 Parachute Battalion
 373 Parachute Battalion

Airborne brigades of the German Army
Military units and formations established in 1993
Military units and formations disestablished in 2014